San Fernando Airport is an airport serving San Fernando, a town in the O'Higgins Region of Chile.

The airport is just northeast of the town. There is mountainous terrain to the west.

See also

Transport in Chile
List of airports in Chile

References

External links
OpenStreetMap - San Fernando
OurAirports - San Fernando
SkyVector - San Fernando

Airports in Chile
Airports in O'Higgins Region